Daniel Eugen Rednic (born 2 February 1978) is a Romanian retired football player. He made his Liga I debut on 20 August 1994 while playing for Maramureș Baia Mare in a 1–1 against Sportul Studențesc București and played for various Romanian clubs such as: Maramureș Baia Mare, Oțelul Galați, Dinamo București, Argeş Piteşti, FC U Craiova or Politehnica Iaşi. Rednic also played in Hungary for MTK Budapest, with which he won a national title and the Super Cup. After he ended his playing career in 2010, Rednic moved to the United States, settling in Concord, California where he coached at a youth football club.

Honours
MTK Hungária
Hungarian League: 2002–03
Hungarian Super Cup: 2003

References

External links
 

1978 births
Living people
People from Maramureș County
Romanian footballers
Association football midfielders
Liga I players
Liga II players
CS Minaur Baia Mare (football) players
ASC Oțelul Galați players
FC Dinamo București players
FC Argeș Pitești players
AFC Rocar București players
FC U Craiova 1948 players
FC Politehnica Iași (1945) players
Nemzeti Bajnokság I players
MTK Budapest FC players
Romanian expatriate footballers
Romanian expatriate sportspeople in Hungary
Expatriate footballers in Hungary